Vincenzo de Doncelli, O.P. (died 1585) was a Roman Catholic prelate who served as Bishop of Valva e Sulmona (1571–1585).

Biography
Vincenzo de Doncelli was ordained a priest in the Order of Preachers.  On 24 September 1571, he was appointed during the papacy of Pope Pius V as Bishop of Valva e Sulmona. 
On 7 October 1571, he was consecrated bishop by Scipione Rebiba, Cardinal-Priest of Santa Maria in Trastevere, with Umberto Locati, Bishop of Bagnoregio, and  Eustachio Locatelli, Bishop of Reggio Emilia, serving as co-consecrators. 
He served as Bishop of Valva e Sulmona until his death in 1585.

While bishop, he was the principal co-consecrator of: Vincenzo Castaneola Marino, Bishop of Alba (1573).

References

External links and additional sources
 (for Chronology of Bishops) 
 (for Chronology of Bishops) 

16th-century Italian Roman Catholic bishops
Bishops appointed by Pope Pius V
1585 deaths
Dominican bishops